Anthony "Tony" Macken (born 30 July 1950) is an Irish former professional footballer. He was born in Dublin.

Career 

Macken was a right back or midfielder who played for Home Farm, Glentoran (1968–1972) and Waterford United F.C. in Ireland before moving to Derby County F.C. in August 1974 for a fee of £30,000. Manager Dave Mackay left Macken in the reserves for the whole of the 1974/75 season.

After a spell on loan at Portsmouth, Macken finally made his league debut on Saturday, 27 December 1975 in a 2–0 win at home to Aston Villa. He again went on loan to Portsmouth in February 1976. His only other appearance for Derby in the season was in a 1–0 loss again against Villa. In all competitions, he made thirty-seven appearances for the Rams, including eight as a substitute before moving to play in America in 1977.

After spells with Washington and Dallas, he returned to England with Walsall in October 1977. He starred in Walsall 1979/80 promotion team and scored once for them in 190 games before returning home to Ireland in June 1982 where he played for Waterford United and Drogheda United. He managed Drogheda United to the League Cup winners in 1983/84. And was assistant manager to Ray Treacy when Shamrock Rovers won the League Championship in 1993/94.

He won his single Republic of Ireland cap – a 1–0 defeat at home to Spain on 9 February 1977.

Honours

As a player
with Walsall
Football League Fourth Division runner-up: 1979–80
Irish League Championship: 2
 Glentoran - 1969/70, 1971/72
League of Ireland: 1
 Waterford - 1973/74

As a manager
League of Ireland Cup
 Drogheda United - 1983/84

References
The Complete Who's Who of Irish International Football, 1945-96 (1996):Stephen McGarrigle

External links 
 

1950 births
Living people
Irish expatriates in the United States
Republic of Ireland association footballers
Republic of Ireland international footballers
Republic of Ireland under-23 international footballers
Waterford F.C. players
Derby County F.C. players
Portsmouth F.C. players
Walsall F.C. players
Drogheda United F.C. players
Home Farm F.C. players
Glentoran F.C. players
League of Ireland players
League of Ireland XI players
English Football League players
NIFL Premiership players
Drogheda United F.C. managers
League of Ireland managers
Washington Diplomats (NASL) players
North American Soccer League (1968–1984) players
Dallas Tornado players
Association football defenders
Republic of Ireland football managers